Gustavo Henrique Moreira Montezano is a Brazilian economist and businessman who served as the president of the Brazilian Social and Economic Development Bank from 2019 to 2023.

Early life 
He earned a Master of Economics at Ibmec University and Bachelor of Engineering at The Instituto Militar de Engenharia.

Career
He was a partner of Banco Pactual, for which he acted as Executive Director for commodities and previously was responsible for the credit area, re-insurance, and project finance. He started his career as an analyst of Banco Opportunity in Rio de Janeiro.

Presidency of BNDES
Joaquim Levy resigned on 16 June 2019, because of a controversy involving President Jair Bolsonaro and the nominee for Director of Capital Markets, Marcos Barbosa Pinto. Marcos Barbosa Pinto was the chief of staff for Demian Fiocca, President of BNDES during the Luiz Inácio Lula da Silva administration. He was invited to serve as president of the bank.

References

Brazilian economists
Brazilian engineers
Naval architects
Year of birth missing (living people)
Living people